The Battle Rages On... is the fourteenth studio album by the British hard rock band Deep Purple, released on July 19th, 1993 (Europe). It is the last album recorded with the band's classic Mk II line-up, which reunited for a second time (the first reunion being for 1984's Perfect Strangers). Even though Mike DiMeo was initially chosen as the singer for the album after Joe Lynn Turner was fired, Ian Gillan eventually returned to the band in late 1992 and had to rework much of the material already existing for it, which had been intended for Joe Lynn Turner and DiMeo. After his firing Turner would admit Ritchie Blackmore referred to the album as "The cattle grazes on". Blackmore became infuriated at the non-melodic elements and left the band for good after a show on 17 November of that same year in Helsinki, Finland. American guitarist Joe Satriani joined Deep Purple as a temporary replacement for the remainder of the tour. A handful of working tracks written during The Battle Rages On... sessions would turn up on subsequent solo releases by Turner under different song titles.

Track listing

Personnel 
Deep Purple
 Ritchie Blackmore – guitar
 Ian Gillan – vocals
 Roger Glover – bass
 Jon Lord – keyboards
 Ian Paice – drums

Production
Produced by Thom Panunzio and Roger Glover
 Basic tracks produced by Thom Panunzio at Bearsville Studios in upstate New York (engineered by Bill Kennedy, assisted by Mike Reiter)
 Vocals and overdubs recorded at Red Rooster Studios (engineered by Hans Gemperle) in Tutzing, Germany, and Greg Rike Studios (engineered by Jason Corsaro, assisted by Wally Walton and Darren Schneider) in Orlando, Florida.
 Mixed by Pat Regan with Roger Glover at Sound on Sound Recording (engineered by Pat Regan, assisted by John Siket, Devin Emke and Peter Beckeman) in New York, and at the Ambient Recording Company (engineered by Pat Regan, assisted by Mark Conese) in Connecticut
 Mastered by George Marino at Sterling Sound in New York.

Charts 
 

Album

Singles

Certifications

References

External links 
 
 14th studio album

Deep Purple albums
1993 albums
Albums produced by Thom Panunzio
Albums produced by Roger Glover
Giant Records (Warner) albums
RCA Records albums